Arjan Dhillon is an Indian singer, rapper and songwriter known for his work in Punjabi music. Dhillon started as a songwriter  in 2017.  He pursued his musical career as lead artist in 2018 with the track "Ishq Jeha Ho Gya" in movie Afsar soundtrack. He got breakthrough with his single track "Bai Bai", released on 29 October 2020 followed by "My Fellas". Dhillon released his debut EP "The Future" on 25 November 2020 and his debut studio album Awara on 25 November 2021.

Early life 
Dhillon was born and raised in Bhadaur, Punjab. He hails from rural Malwa region of panjab. he wrote on Great Sikhs in jails and his most loved song in 2023 was Maharani jinda which was on Maharaja Duleep Singh who was last king of sikh empire and son of great maharaja Ranjit singh. Arjan graduated from Kurukshetra University. He is one of the most popular singer in Rural Areas of Panjab in 2022-2023. His every song is superhit among rural audience of panjab. Tractor lovers and farmers love to use his songs in reels and short videos.

Career

2017–2019: Debut as lyricist and singer
Dhillon started his career as a lyricist in 2017, initially penned various tracks for Nimrat Khaira, including "Suit", "Tohar", "Lehnga", "Ranihaar". In 2018, he started his singing career with song "Ishq Jeha Ho Gaya" from Afsars soundtrack, he also penned four tracks "Udhar Chalda", Sun Sohniye", "Khat", "Ravaya Na Kar" of the soundtrack. Following this, He also penned Hustinder's "Pind Puchdi" and Nishawn Bhullar's "Muchh" tracks. Dhillon released his debut single track "Shera Samb Lai" in June 2019 on Brown Studios YouTube channel.

2020-2021: Musical breakthrough, The Future, Awara

2020 was breakthrough year for Dhillon's musical career. In March 2020, he released "Jatt di Janeman". This song was followed by his audio track "Uber". He finally came in limelight in 2020 with his single tracks "Bai Bai" and "My Fellas", and also released various other successful tracks like "Kala Jaadu" and "Mull Pyar Da" in the following months. On 25 November 2020, he released his debut EP The Future, consisting of six tracks. Later on 30 November, for making his contribution to 2020-2021 Indian farmers' protest through his singing and encouraging protesters, Dhillon released his single track "Panjab Kithe Dabda". Following this, he released one more non-commercial song, named "Soorme Aun Tareeka Te".

In February 2021, Dhillon released 3 songs "Gutt", "Likhari", and "Jutti" on the same day, with the video of "Gutt" song which is the most viewed song of Arjan Dhillon on YouTube with more than 50 million views. Besides, Dhillon released 5 single tracks in 2021, including "Jaagde Raho", "Pindaa De Naa", "Pehli Peshi", "My Rulez" and "Kalli Sohni".
In 2021, Dhillon penned lyrics for Diljit Dosanjh's "Luna" from MoonChild Era album. The album peaked at no. 32 on Canadian Albums Chart by Billboard. In October, Dhillon featured as guest artist for first time in Shipra Goyal's Koke song, he also penned that song. In November 2021, he announced his debut studio album Awara which was released on 25 November. His debut album charted at 8 on  Spotify Top Albums Debut Global. Album also charted at 1 on  Spotify Top Albums India and at 2 on  Apple Music Top Indian Albums. Dhillon reached 1 million followers on instagram in December 2021. At the same time, he had more than 1.2 million Spotify listeners . In December 2021, Dhillon's written duet song "What Ve" was released in the voice of Diljit Dosanjh, and Nimrat Khaira. In December, Dhillon announced his debut concert tour "Destiny Tour Canada" (2022) alongside Nimrat Khaira via his Instagram story.

2022: Destiny Tour and Jalwa

In February 2022, Nimrat Khaira's album "Nimmo" was released in which Dhillon served as lyricist in 7 songs and also co-singer in 1 song "Ki Karde Je". "Ki Karde Je" was the first duet song of Arjan Dhillon, it also charted at 36 position on UK Asian music charts. In March 2022, he released his new single track "Jawani", which is the most streamed song of Arjan Dhillon on Spotify with more than 20 million streams.
In April 2022, Arjan Dhillon embarked on his debut concert tour "Destiny Tour Canada" alongside Nimrat Khaira. During Tour, they performed in five different cities of Canada. In April 2022, he released his new single track "Setting"; it was followed by two other single tracks "Thabba Ku Zulfan" on May 12, and "Nakhre" on July 11. Following this, Arjan also announced Destiny Tour Australia and New Zealand with Nimrat Khaira. It began on 6 August, 2022 in Perth and continued until September 7, 2022 with its final destination scheduled in Canberra, Australia.

In August 2022, he released a duet song “Photo” with Nimrat Khaira. On August 24, 2022, Dhillon released music video of his Awara album's song "Mandeer". One week later, he released his new single track "Panjab Warga". On October 13, 2022 Arjan Dhillon released the cover of his second studio album "Jalwa" on Instagram and, announced that album would be released on 17 October, 2022. "Jalwa" album included 12 solo songs, album was released altogether on 17 October. "Jalwa" album charted at 9 on  Spotify Top Albums Debut Global.Album also charted at 3 on  Spotify Top Albums India, at 2 on  Apple Music Top Indian Albums, and at 2 on Apple Music Top Canadian Albums. Dhillon reached 1.5 million followers on instagram in October 2022. At the same time, he had more than 2.4 million Spotify listeners. On 17 October 2022, first music video of "Jalwa" album's "25-25" song was released, "25-25" song charted at 28 on UK Asian music chart, and at 19 on 
UK Punjabi music chart.
 On 31 October 2022, he released 2nd music video of "Jalwa" album's "It's My Time" song.

Artistry 
In an interview with The Times of India, when asked about his specific style Dhillon said, " I think I am yet to explore or define my style. So far I believe there’s no particular style of mine. I write things as I see them. If I feel something, if there’s news that touched me, if there’s an encounter that changed things, I pen it."

Discography

Studio albums
 Awara (2021)
 Jalwa (2022)
 A for Arjan (2022)
Extended Plays
The Future (Volume, 1)

Tours
 Destiny Tour Canada  (April 2022)
 Destiny Tour Australia - New Zealand  (2022)

References

External links 
 

Living people
Singers from Punjab, India
Punjabi-language lyricists
Indian male singers
People from Barnala district
Year of birth missing (living people)